The Tango of Our Childhood is a 1984 Soviet-Armenian tragicomedy film written and directed by Albert Mkrtchyan and starring Frunzik Mkrtchyan (his brother) and Galya Novents. Novents' performance as a mother who struggles to raise her children during post-World War II Armenia was awarded Special Mention at the Venice Film Festival. Mkrtchyan dedicated the autobiographical story to his hometown of Gyumri. The filming locations highlighted the historic buildings of Gyumri which were marked for preservation as the Kumayri Reserve in 1980. The New York Times described Novents' performance as that of "a kind of Anna Magnani earth mother who acts at the top of her lungs."

Plot 
The film is set in Leninakan (now Gyumri) in the aftermath of World War II.  Novents portrays a wife whose husband has left her and their three children for his wife's best friend.

Cast 

 Galya Novents - Siranush
 Frunzik Mkrtchyan -  Ruben
 Elina Agamyan -  Vardush
 Azat Gasparyan -  Mesrop
 Narine Bagdasaryan -  Ruzan
 Samvel Sarkisyan -  Armen
 Ashot Gevorkyan -  Gagik
 Artashes Nalbandyan -  Ashot
 Artashes Gedikyan -  Serob
 Margarita Karapetyan -  Arpenik
 Nona Petrosyan -  Knar
 Ruben Mkrtchyan -  Yeghish
 V. Movsisyan -  Svasyan
 Aleksandr Oganesyan -  Zarzand
 Vrezh Hakobyan -  Melkonyan
Kadzhik Barsegyan - Investigator

References

External links

1985 films
1985 comedy-drama films
Soviet-era Armenian films
1985 comedy films
1985 drama films